Hippeastrum aviflorum is a flowering  perennial herbaceous bulbous plant, in the family Amaryllidaceae, found in Argentina.

Taxonomy 
Described by Dutilh in 1997

References

Sources 
 
 GBIF: Hippeastrum aviflorum

Flora of South America
aviflorum
Garden plants of South America